Royal–Crumpler–Parker House is a historic home located at Clinton, Sampson County, North Carolina.   It was built about 1918, and is a one-story, rectangular, Bungalow  / American Craftsman style frame dwelling.  It has a wide, low, cross-gable roof; is sheathed in weatherboard; and dormers.  It features a wraparound porch with octagonal greenhouse.

It was added to the National Register of Historic Places in 1986.

References

Houses on the National Register of Historic Places in North Carolina
Houses completed in 1918
Houses in Sampson County, North Carolina
National Register of Historic Places in Sampson County, North Carolina